The list of marine molluscs of South Africa is a list of saltwater species that form a part of the molluscan fauna of South Africa. This list does not include the land or freshwater molluscs.

Gastropoda
See List of marine gastropods of South Africa

Bivalvia
Bivalves in South Africa include:

Nuculidae
Nucula nucleus Linnaeus, 1758

Mytilidae – Mussels

Estuarine mussel Arcuatula capensis (Cape Agulhas to Mozambique)
Ribbed mussel Aulacomya ater (Namibia to Eastern Cape)
Brack-water mussel Brachidontes virgiliae (Eastern Cape to Mozambique)
Semistriated mussel Brachidontes semistriatus (Port Elizabeth to Mozambique)
Black mussel Choromytilus meridionalis (Namibia to Tsitsikamma)
Half-hairy mussel Gregariella petagnae (Namibia to central KwaZulu-Natal)
Ear mussel Modiolus auriculatus (Port Elizabeth to Mozambique)
Mediterranean mussel Mytilus galloprovincialis (Orange river to Eastern Cape)
Brown mussel Perna perna (Cape Point to Mozambique)

Ledge mussel Septifer bilocularis (Port Elizabeth to Mozambique)

Arcidae – Ark clams
Arca avellana Lamarck, 1819 (Port Elizabeth to Mozambique)
Arca navicularis Brughiere, 1789
Arca tortuosa Linnaeus 1758
Barbatia candida (Helbling, 1779) syn. Arca helblingi
Oblique ark shell Barbatia obliquata (Cape Columbine to Mozambique)

Noetiidae
Striarca symmetrica (Port Elizabeth to Mozambique)

Pinnidae – Pen shells
Horse mussel Atrina squamifera (Cape Columbine to Eastern Cape)
Pinna muricata (Port Elizabeth to Mozambique)

Gryphaeidae
Hyotissa numisma (Transkei to Mozambique)

Ostreidae – True oysters
Weed oyster Ostrea algoensis Sowerby, 1871
Ostrea atherstonei (Saldanha Bay to KwaZulu-Natal south coast)
Natal rock oyster Saccostrea cuccullata (Port Elizabeth to Mozambique) (syn. Crassostrea cuccullata)
Cape rock oyster Striostrea margaritacea (Cape Point to Mozambique)

Anomiidae – Saddle oysters
Saddle oyster Anomia achaeus (Port Elizabeth to Mozambique)

Gryphaeidae – Honeycomb oysters
Hyotissa numisma

Pteriidae – Pearl oysters
Cape pearl oyster Pinctada capensis (Cape Agulhas to Mozambique)

Pectinidae – Scallops
Dwarf fan shell Chlamys tincta (Cape Columbine to Mozambique)
Scallop Pecten sulcicostatus (Cape Point to Eastern Cape)

Limidae – File shells
File shell Limaria tuberculata (Cape Columbine to KwaZulu-Natal south coast)

Cardiidae – Cockles
Cockle Trachycardium flavum (Central KwaZulu-Natal to Mozambique)
Trachycardium rubicundum (Eastern Transkei to Mozambique)

Tridacnidae – Giant clams
Giant clam Tridacna squamosa (Northern KwaZulu-Natal to Mozambique)
Tridacna maxima (Zululand)

Mactridae – Trough shells
Otter shell Lutraria lutraria (Namibia to Eastern Cape)
Smooth trough shell Mactra glabrata (Cape Columbine to Mozambique)
Angular surf clam Scissodesma spengleri (Cape Point to Eastern Cape)

Carditidae
Rectangular false cockle Cardita variegata (Mossel Bay to Mozambique)
Dead man's hands Thecalia concamerata (Port Nolloth to Transkei)

Condylocardiidae
Rough false cockle Carditella rugosa (Mossel Bay to central KwaZulu-Natal)
Carditella capensis (West coast)

Solenidae
Pencil bait Solen capensis (Namaqualand to Eastern Cape)
Solen cylindraceus (Transkei to Mozambique)

Lucinidae
Smooth platter shell Loripes clausus Philippi 1848 (Mossel Bay to Mozambique)

Unionidae
Toothless platter shell Anodontia edentula Linnaeus 1758 (Mossel Bay to Mozambique)

Lasaeidae
Dwarf rusty clam Lasaea adansoni turtoni (Cape Point to Mozambique) Gmelin 1791
Tellimya trigona (West coast)

Tellinidae

Ridged tellin Gastrana matadoa (Cape Point to northern KwaZulu-Natal)
Littoral tellin Macoma litoralis (Mossel Bay to Mozambique)
Port Alfred tellin Tellina alfredensis Linnaeus 1758 (Cape Point to KwaZulu-Natal south coast)
Tellina capsoides (Durban to Mozambique)
Gilchrist's tellin Tellina gilchristi (Cape Columbine to Eastern Cape)
Tellina trilatera (Orange river to Transkei)

Teredinidae
Shipworm Bankia carinata (Mossel Bay to Mozambique)

Donacidae – Wedge shells
Donax bipartitus (East London to Mozambique)
Round ended wedge shell Donax burnupi (Cape Point to Mozambique)
Slippery wedge shell Donax lubricus (Port Alfred to Mozambique)
Ridged wedge shell Donax madagscariensis (Transkei to Mozambique)
White mussel or Wedge shell Donax serra (Namibia to Transkei)
Donax sordidus (Cape Point to Transkei)

Psammobiidae – Sunset clams
Sunset clam Hiatula lunulata (Transkei to Mozambique)
Sand tellin Psammotellina capensis (Cape Agulhas to Transkei)

Veneridae – Venus shells
Heart clam Dosinia lupinus orbignyi (Namibia to Eastern Cape)
Dosinia hepatica (Mossel Bay to Mozambique)
Beaked clam Eumarcia paupercula (Mossel Bay to Mozambique)
Ribbed venus Gafrarium pectinatum alfredense (Port Elizabeth to Mozambique)

Zigzag clam Pitar abbreviatus (Cape Point to Mozambique)
Mottled venus Sunetta contempta bruggeni? (Cape Point to northern KwaZulu-Natal)
Streaked sand clam Tivela compressa (Cape Point to Eastern Cape)
Tivela polita (Transkei to Mozambique)
Corrugated venus Venerupis corrugatus (Namibia to central KwaZulu-Natal)
Warty venus Venus verrucosa (Namibia to Mozambique)

Polyplacophora
 
Chitons (Polyplacophora) in South Africa include:

Ischnochitonidae
Textile chiton Ischnochiton textilis (Gray, 1828) (Namibia to central KwaZulu-Natal)
Dwarf chiton Ischnochiton oniscus (Krauss, 1848) (Cape Columbine to Mozambique)
Ribbed scale chiton Ischnochiton bergoti (Velain, 1877) (Namibia to Cape Point)
Ischnochiton hewitti

Chitonidae
Tulip chiton Chiton (Rhyssoplax) politus Spengler, 1797 syn Chiton tulipa (Quoy & Gaimard, 1835) (Cape Columbine to KwaZulu-Natal south coast)
Brooding chiton Chiton nigrovirescens de Blainville, 1825 (Namibia to Cape Agulhas) (accepted as Radsia nigrovirescens)
Black chiton Onithochiton literatus (Krauss, 1848) (Cape Point to Mozambique)

Callochitonidae
Broad chiton Callochiton castaneus (Wood, 1815) (Orange river to northern KwaZulu-Natal)

Acanthochitona
Spiny chiton Acanthochitona garnoti de Blainville, 1825 (Cape Columbine to KwaZulu-Natal south coast)
Craspedochiton producta Phil

Chaetopleuridae
Giant chiton or Armadillo Dinoplax gigas Gmelin, 1791 (Cape Point to KwaZulu-Natal south coast)
Dinoplax validifossus Ashby (Northern Transkei to Kwazulu-Natal)
Hairy chiton Chaetopleura (Chaetopleura) papilio (Spengler, 1797) (Namibia to Cape Point)
Orange hairy chiton Chaetopleura (Chaetopleura) pertusa (Reeve, 1847) (Cape Columbine to northern KwaZulu-Natal)

Cephalopoda
Cephalopods in South Africa include:

Octopoda – Octopus

 
Octopodidae
Common octopus Octopus vulgaris Cuvier, 1797 (Namibia to northern KwaZulu-Natal)
Giant octopus Octopus magnificus Villanueva et al., 1992  (syn. Enteroctopus magnificus)
Brush tipped octopus Aphrodoctopus schultzei Hoyle, 1910 (Cape Columbine to Cape Point) (syn. Eledone thysanophora)

Argonautidae

Paper nautilus Argonauta argo Linnaeus, 1758 (Cape Point to northern KwaZulu-Natal)

Teuthida – Squid

Loliginidae
Indian Ocean squid Loligo duvauceli Orbigny, 1848 (Port Alfred to Mozambique)
Chokka or Calimari Loligo vulgaris reynaudi (Orbigny, 1845) (Orange river to Eastern Cape) (syn. Loligo reynaudi Orbigny, 1845)
Diamond squid Thysanoteuthis rhombus Troschel, 1857 

Sepiolida – Bobtail squid
Unidentified species (Cape Peninsula, both sides)

Sepiida – Cuttlefish

Sepiidae
Sepia papillata Quoy & Gaimard, 1832 
Beautiful cuttlefish Sepia (Hemisepius) pulchra Roeleveld & Liltved, 1985 
Sepia simoniana Thiele, 1920 
Tuberculate cuttlefish Sepia tuberculata Lamarck, 1798 (Cape Columbine to Eastern Cape)
Common cuttlefish Sepia vermiculata Quoy and Gaimard, 1832 (Orange river to Mozambique)

Spirulida – Ram's horn squid

Spirulidae
Ram's horn shell Spirula spirula Linnaeus 1758 (Eastern Cape to Mozambique)

Scaphopoda
Tusk shells (Scaphopoda) in South Africa include:

Dentaliidae
Dentalium regulare E.A. Smith, 1903 (Jeffreys Bay to Durban)
Antalis longirostrum (Reeve, 1843) (Indo-Pacific to KwaZulu-Natal south coast)

Gadilidae
Siphonodentalium booceras (Tomlin, 1926) 
Cadulus spp. Three other species known here, all inhabiting deep water

See also
 List of non-marine molluscs of South Africa

Lists of molluscs of surrounding countries:
 List of marine molluscs of Namibia, (north from Namibia: List of marine molluscs of Angola)
 List of marine molluscs of Mozambique

References

 Mollusc, Marine
South Africa, molluscs
Mollusc, marine
South Africa01
Marine biodiversity of South Africa